KFOO (1440 AM) is a commercial radio station that is licensed to Riverside, California and broadcasts to the Riverside—San Bernardino, California area. The station is owned by iHeartMedia and airs an all-news radio format as an affiliate of Black Information Network. The KFOO studios are located in Riverside and the transmitter tower is in Colton along the Santa Ana River.

History

Early years
The station first signed on in 1941 as KPRO and was owned by Broadcasting Corporation of America.

In December 1964, KPRO was purchased by radio and television personality Dick Clark. The station was held under the name Progress Broadcasting, a wholly owned subsidiary of Dick Clark Productions. In March 1978, Progress sold KPRO to Inland Empire Broadcasters, majority-owned by station vice president Howard N. Fisher, for $780,000.

In the early 1980s, KPRO aired a news/talk format with some sports programming. By 1984 the station was facing severe financial difficulties, and in May of that year KPRO filed for Chapter 11 bankruptcy and reduced its programming to only sports play-by-play. Because the station's programming dropped to under 12 hours daily, the Federal Communications Commission (FCC) considered KPRO to have gone silent.

In June 1986, Klein/Ray broadcasting sold KPRO to Lincoln Dellar-owned Inland Wireless Co. for $710,000. The new owner changed its call sign to KDIF on September 23. KDIF changed hands only three years later on October 24, 1989, when Hispanic Radio Broadcasters, headed by Gilberto Esquivel, bought the station.

Jacor/Clear Channel/iHeartMedia era (1998–present)
KDIF, which was airing a regional Mexican format, was purchased by Jacor Communications in May 1998 for $2.65 million. The station immediately added Los Angeles Dodgers game broadcasts in English, though it otherwise retained its Spanish-language programming. Jacor merged with Clear Channel Communications later that year.

On September 27, 2010, KDIF flipped from Spanish oldies to an all-comedy format branded "24/7 Comedy" and began using new call letters KFNY (meaning "funny"). On August 4, 2014, following the demise of the 24/7 Comedy radio network, the station flipped to news/talk as "NewsTalk AM 1440". Clear Channel changed its name to iHeartMedia a month later.

On May 15, 2017, KFNY exchanged formats with KKDD in San Bernardino, flipping to Spanish adult hits and sending the news/talk format to 1290 AM. KFNY was rebranded as "La Preciosa 1440". On November 14, the station swapped call signs with KFOO in Tacoma, Washington as part of an impending sale of the latter station.

On June 29, 2020, fifteen iHeartMedia stations in markets with large African American populations, including KFOO, began stunting with speeches by prominent African Americans, interspersed with messages such as "our voices will be heard" and "our side of the story is about to be told", with a new format slated to launch the following day. On June 30 at 9:00 a.m., KFOO began broadcasting as a charter affiliate of Black Information Network (BIN), an all-news radio format targeted to the African American community.

References

External links
FCC History Cards for KFOO

FOO (AM)
Mass media in Riverside, California
All-news radio stations in the United States
Radio stations established in 1941
1941 establishments in California
IHeartMedia radio stations
Black Information Network stations